Maor Asor (born 25 August 1988) is an Israeli footballer, currently playing for F.C. Holon Yermiyahu.

References

External links

1988 births
Living people
Israeli footballers
Hapoel Tel Aviv F.C. players
Maccabi Ironi Bat Yam F.C. players
Maccabi Netanya F.C. players
Sektzia Ness Ziona F.C. players
Hapoel Ashkelon F.C. players
Hapoel Rishon LeZion F.C. players
Maccabi Jaffa F.C. players
Hakoah Maccabi Amidar Ramat Gan F.C. players
Bnei Jaffa F.C. players
F.C. Holon Yermiyahu players
Hapoel Azor F.C. players
Hapoel Bik'at HaYarden F.C. players
Hapoel Mahane Yehuda F.C. players
Israeli Premier League players
Israeli people of Moroccan-Jewish descent
Liga Leumit players
Footballers from Bat Yam
Association football midfielders